Brenizer may refer to:

Brenizer, Pennsylvania
Brenizer Library
Brenizer Method